(March 22, 1212 – August 31, 1234) was the 86th emperor of Japan, according to the traditional order of succession. His reign spanned the years from 1221 CE through 1232 CE.

This 13th-century sovereign was named after the 10th-century Emperor Horikawa and go- (後), translates literally as "later"; and thus, he is sometimes called the "Later Emperor Horikawa". The Japanese word go has also been translated to mean the "second one;" and in some older sources, this emperor may be identified as "Horikawa, the second," or as "Horikawa II."

Genealogy
The third son of Imperial Prince Morisada (守貞親王) (Go-Takakura-in, 後高倉院), the second son of Emperor Takakura.

Empress (Jingū): Sanjō (Fujiwara) Ariuko (三条（藤原）有子) later Ankimon’in (安喜門院), Sanjo Kinfusa’s daughter

Empress (Chūgū): Konoe (Fujiwara) Nagako (近衛（藤原）長子) Later Takatsukasa’in (鷹司院), Konoe Iezane’s daughter.

Empress (Chūgū): Kujō (Fujiwara) Shunshi (九条（藤原）竴子) Later Sōhekimon’in (藻璧門院), Kujo Michiie’s daughter
First son: Imperial Prince Mitsuhito (秀仁親王) later Emperor Shijō
Fourth daughter: Imperial Princess Hoshi (暤子内親王; 1232-1237)
Second Son: (1233)

Lady-in-waiting: Betto-Naishi (別当典侍), Jimyōin Ieyuki’s daughter
First daughter: Imperial Princess Kishi (暉子内親王; 1228-1300) later Muromachi-in (室町院)
Second daughter: Imperial Princess Taishi (体子内親王; 1231-1302) later Shinsenmon’in (神仙門院)

Lady-in-waiting: Dainagon-no-Tsubone (大納言局), Fujiwara Kaneyoshi’s daughter
Third daughter: Imperial Princess Akiko (昱子内親王; 1231-1246)

Events of Go-Horikawa's life
In 1221 CE, because of the Jōkyū Incident, an unsuccessful attempt by Emperor Go-Toba to seize real power, the Kamakura shogunate completely excluded those of the imperial family descended from Emperor Go-Toba from the Chrysanthemum throne,  thus forcing Emperor Chūkyō to abdicate.  After the Genpei War, he, as the grandson of the late Emperor Takakura, who was also a nephew of the then-exiled Retired Emperor Go-Toba, and Chūkyō's first cousin, was enthroned as Go-Horikawa.  He ruled from July 29, 1221 CE to October 26 (?), 1232 CE.

 1221 CE (Jōkyū 3, 9th day of the 7th month): In the 1st year of what is now considered to have been Chūkyō-tennōs reign (仲恭天皇一年), he abruptly abdicated without designating an heir; and contemporary scholars then construed that the succession (‘‘senso’’)  was received by a grandson of former Emperor Go-Toba.
 1221 CE (Jōkyū 3, 1st day of the 12th month): Emperor Go-Horikawa acceded to the throne (‘‘sokui’’).

As Go-Horikawa was only ten-years-old at this time, his father Imperial Prince Morisada acted as cloistered emperor under the name Go-Takakura-in.

In 1232 CE, he began his own cloistered rule, abdicating to his 1-year-old son, Emperor Shijō.  However, he had a weak constitution, and his cloistered rule lasted just under two years before he died.

Kugyō
Kugyō (公卿) is a collective term for the very few most powerful men attached to the court of the Emperor of Japan in pre-Meiji eras.

In general, this elite group included only three to four men at a time.  These were hereditary courtiers whose experience and background would have brought them to the pinnacle of a life's career.  During Go-Horikawa's reign, this apex of the  Daijō-kan included:
 Sesshō, Konoe Iezane, d. 1242 CE.
 Sadaijin, Konoe Iemichi, 1204–1224 CE.
 Udaijin,  Fujiwara Kintsugu, 1117–1227 CE.
 Naidaijin, Saionji Kintsune, 1171–1224 CE.
 Dainagon

Eras of Go-Horikawa's reign
The years of Go-Horikawa's reign are more specifically identified by more than one era name or nengō.
 Jōkyū      (1219–1222 CE)
 Jōō  (1222–1224 CE)
 Gennin           (1224–1225 CE)
 Karoku           (1225–1227 CE)
 Antei            (1227–1229 CE)
 Kangi            (1229–1232 CE)

See also
 Emperor of Japan
 List of Emperors of Japan
 Imperial cult

Notes

References

 Brown, Delmer M. and Ichirō Ishida, eds. (1979). [ Jien, c. 1220], Gukanshō (The Future and the Past, a translation and study of the Gukanshō, an interpretative history of Japan written in 1219). Berkeley: University of California Press. 
 Ponsonby-Fane, Richard Arthur Brabazon. (1959).  The Imperial House of Japan. Kyoto: Ponsonby Memorial Society. OCLC 194887
 Titsingh, Isaac, ed. (1834). [Siyun-sai Rin-siyo/Hayashi Gahō, 1652], Nipon o daï itsi ran; ou, Annales des empereurs du Japon.]  Paris: Oriental Translation Fund of Great Britain and Ireland.
 Varley, H. Paul , ed. (1980). [ Kitabatake Chikafusa, 1359], Jinnō Shōtōki  ([https://books.google.com/books?id=tVv6OAAACAAJ&dq=A+Chronicle+of+Gods+and+Sovereigns:+Jinn%C5%8D+Sh%C5%8Dt%C5%8Dki+of+Kitabatake+Chikafusa&lr= A Chronicle of Gods and Sovereigns: Jinnō Shōtōki. New York: Columbia University Press. 

 
 

Japanese emperors
1212 births
1234 deaths
Emperor Go-Horikawa
Emperor Go-Horikawa
Emperor Go-Horikawa
13th-century Japanese monarchs